The Troubles in Castlewellan recounts incidents during, and the effects of, The Troubles in Castlewellan, County Down, Northern Ireland.

Incidents in Castlewellan during the Troubles resulting in two or more fatalities:

1980
6 January 1980 - James Cochrane (21, a Catholic), Robert Smyth (18, a Protestant), and Richard Wilson (21, a Protestant), all members of the Ulster Defence Regiment, were killed in a Provisional Irish Republican Army land mine attack on their mobile patrol, near Castlewellan.

References 
NI Conflict Archive on the Internet

Castlewellan